Nói Albínói is an album by Slowblow, released in 2004. The album contains the soundtrack to the movie Nói Albínói. Most of the mixing took place in Sigur Rós' studio. "Morgun" and "Komdu Litla Barnið" were written and performed by Sigríður Níelsdóttir. "Elegy" is part of a string quartet by Dmitri Shostakovich, performed by The Rubio Quartet.

Track listing
"Beginning" - 1:25
"Hillbilly" - 1:52
"Hole" - 0:57
"Another Beginning" - 1:18
"Rainbow" - 1:02
"Morgun" - 3:16
"Piece of Cake" - 1:57
"Why Hawaii?" - 2:54
"Maproom" - 1:31
"Love on a Couch" - 0:49
"Dinner" - 2:25
"Another Hole" - 2:50
"Date" - 0:53
"Komdu Litla Barnið" - 4:39
"Grave" - 1:22
"Love on the Phone" - 1:24
"Groove" - 3:36
"Sjoppa" - 1:48
"Elegy" - 12:26
"Aim for a Smile" - 4:16

2004 albums
Slowblow albums